The mixed team's Modern pentathlon competitions at the 2010 Summer Youth Olympics in Singapore were held on August 24, at the Singapore Sports School.

Each team contained one male and one female pentathlete. Only the fencing, swimming, shooting and running portions were done at the Youth Olympics.  The results of each of the four segments of the modern pentathlon were converted into points scores based on a par value of 1000 points per event. Competitors doing better than par would receive more points. At the end of the first two segments, the points would be calculated and the pentathletes would be handicapped for the final segment based on their scores such that a simultaneous finish in that segment would result in identical overall scores.

The first segment was a mass round robin one touch épée, the second was a 2x100 metre freestyle swimming relay and the final segment was combined running and shooting where athletes ran the 2x1500 metre relay and shot using the laser pistol.

Medalists

Results

References

External links 

Singapore 2010 Youth Olympic Games - Highlights of the Games

Modern pentathlon at the 2010 Summer Youth Olympics